The men's team épée was one of seven fencing events on the fencing at the 1956 Summer Olympics programme. It was the tenth appearance of the event. The competition was held on 28 November 1956. 55 fencers from 11 nations competed.

Competition format
The competition used a pool play format, with each team facing the other teams in the pool in a round robin. Each match consisted of 16 bouts, with 4 fencers on one team facing each of the 4 fencers on the other team. Bouts were to 5 touches. Total touches against were the tie-breaker if a match was tied 8 bouts to 8. However, only as much fencing was done as was necessary to determine advancement, so some matches never occurred and some matches were stopped before the full 16 bouts were fenced if the teams advancing from the pool could be determined.

Rosters

Australia
 James Wolfensohn
 Ivan Lund
 Keith Hackshall
 Hilbert Van Dijk

Belgium
 François Dehez
 Roger Achten
 Ghislain Delaunois
 Marcel Van Der Auwera
 Jacques Debeur

Colombia
 Alfredo Yanguas
 Emiliano Camargo
 Emilio Echeverry
 Pablo Uribe

France
 Armand Mouyal
 Claude Nigon
 Daniel Dagallier
 Yves Dreyfus
 René Queyroux

Great Britain
 René Paul
 Raymond Paul
 Michael Howard
 Bill Hoskyns
 Allan Jay

Hungary
 József Sákovics
 Béla Rerrich
 Lajos Balthazár
 Ambrus Nagy
 József Marosi
 Barnabás Berzsenyi

Italy
 Edoardo Mangiarotti
 Giuseppe Delfino
 Carlo Pavesi
 Franco Bertinetti
 Giorgio Anglesio
 Alberto Pellegrino

Luxembourg
 Émile Gretsch
 Jean-Fernand Leischen
 Édouard Schmit
 Roger Theisen

Soviet Union
 Arnold Chernushevich
 Valentin Chernikov
 Lev Saychuk
 Revaz Tsirek'idze
 Juozas Ūdras
 Valentin Vdovichenko

Sweden
 Berndt-Otto Rehbinder
 Carl Forssell
 Per Carleson
 Bengt Ljungquist
 John Sandwall

United States
 Skip Shurtz
 Richard Pew
 Ralph Goldstein
 Abram Cohen
 Kinmont Hoitsma

Results

Round 1

The top two nations in each pool advanced to the semifinals.

Pool 1

In the first set of pairings, Italy defeated Australia 11–5 and Great Britain defeated the United States 9–7. Italy and the United States split the bouts in their match 8–8, with Italy prevailing on touches against (63–65). When Great Britain took a 9–3 lead in its match against Australia, the pool was declared finished as Great Britain and Italy were both guaranteed advancement at 2–0 compared to the other two teams at 0–2.

Pool 2

In the first set of pairings, Hungary defeated Colombia 14–2 and the Soviet Union defeated Sweden 9–7. The Soviet Union defeated Colombia 15–1. When Hungary took a 9–5 lead in its match against Sweden, the pool was declared finished as Hungary and the Soviet Union were both guaranteed advancement at 2–0 compared to the other two teams at 0–2.

Pool 3

Belgium defeated Luxembourg 11–5. The match between France and Luxembourg was stopped at 9–6 because Luxembourg was then guaranteed to finish 0–2 and be eliminated.

Semifinals

The top two nations in each pool advanced to the final.

Semifinal 1

Hungary defeated Belgium 11–5 in the first match. Belgium and Italy split the bouts 8–8 in the second, with Belgium taking the match win on touches against, 63–67. This put Belgium in the position of watching the final match, needing either a Hungary win or an Italy victory by blowout (14–2 or better) to advance. When the Italy–Hungary match reached 9 bouts to 3 in Italy's favor, neither outcome was possible and Belgium was mathematically eliminated—ending the pool.

Semifinal 2

Great Britain (10–6) and then France (9–7) each defeated the Soviet Union, eliminating the latter team.

Final

The first two pairings saw Hungary defeat France (9–7) and Italy beat Great Britain (10–6). Hungary and Italy each won again in the second pairings, this time Hungary over Great Britain (10–6) and Italy against France (15–1). With two 2–0 teams and two 0–2 teams, the third set of pairings in the round-robin were effectively a gold medal match and a bronze medal match. France defeated Great Britain 9–3 to take the bronze medal, while Italy prevailed over Hungary 9–3 for the gold.

References

Epee team
Men's events at the 1956 Summer Olympics